Hit Girls is a 2013 Australian martial arts action comedy short film. It was written, produced and directed by Maria Tran; co-directed by Adrian Castro and co-stars the Juju Chan.

Synopsis 
Two assassins, serene Pixie Ho (Juju Chan) and acerbic Charlie Vu (Maria Tran) are reaching breaking point in their partnership.  They must put aside their differences when they go undercover as school girls to eliminate the son of millionaire Michael Huang (Thien Nguyen) - their former primary school crush.

Awards 
 2013 Official Section for the Action On Film International Film Festival, US
 Winner of "Breakout Action Actress" played by Maria Tran and Juju Chan at the 2013 Action On Film International Film Festival
 Winner of "Best Villain" played by Thien Nguyen at the 2013 Action On Film International Film Festival

Cast 
 Maria Tran as Charlie Vu
 Juju Chan as Pixie Ho
 Thien Nguyen as Michael Huang
 Adrian Castro as Mc Quade

Production 
The script was written by Maria Tran in September, 2012 after several conversations with Antony Szeto and Juju Chan who were preparing for their holiday in Australia at that time. The film was shot in 5 days and most of the locations were in suburb of Fairfield, with one shot from Broken Hill.  A total of $4,050 USD was raised in making the short film and all the 100 cast and crew volunteered their time for the project. The action sequences were choreographed by Trung Ly.

Other 
Antony Szeto visited the set on day two of the shoot. This was where he discovered Trung Ly and mentioned that if he was to direct the next project, that he will be on board. That project turned into Roger Corman's "Fist of the Dragon".

References

External links 
Hit Girls at IMDb

2006 films
Australian independent films
2006 martial arts films
Australian action comedy films
2006 independent films
Australian comedy short films
2000s English-language films